Hiromu (written: 弘, 広務, 弥夢, 大夢 or ひろむ in hiragana) is a unisex Japanese given name. Notable people with the name include:

, Japanese manga artist
, Japanese baseball player
, Japanese baseball player
, Japanese footballer
, Japanese footballer
, Japanese prosecutor
, Japanese baseball pitcher
, Japanese voice actor
, Japanese footballer
, Japanese politician
, Japanese test driver and engineer
, Japanese politician
, Japanese manga artist
, Japanese sports shooter
, Japanese manga artist
, Japanese professional wrestler
, Japanese footballer 
, Japanese shogi player
, Japanese athlete

Japanese unisex given names